Agotime-Ziope is one of the constituencies represented in the Parliament of Ghana. It elects one Member of Parliament (MP) by the first past the post system of election. Agotime-Ziope is located in the newly created Agotime Ziope district of the Volta Region of Ghana. It was created in 2012 by the Electoral Commission of Ghana prior to the Ghanaian general election.

Members of Parliament 

The first ever election was held in December 2012 as part of the Ghanaian elections. The National Democratic Congress candidate won the seat with a 12,550 majority. This new constituency was partly carved out of the former Ho East so the first elected Member of Parliament was the sitting MP for Ho East. The National Democratic Party has held this seat since the creation of this constituency although there has been a change of MP.

Elections

See also
List of Ghana Parliament constituencies
Ho East

References

Parliamentary constituencies in the Volta Region